Mathukumalli Vidyasagar  (born 29 September 1947) is a leading control theorist and a Fellow of Royal Society. He is currently  a Distinguished Professor in Electrical Engineering  at IIT Hyderabad. Previously he was the Cecil & Ida Green (II) Chair of Systems Biology Science at the University of Texas at Dallas. Prior to that he was an executive vice-president at Tata Consultancy Services (TCS) where he headed the Advanced Technology Center. Earlier, he was the director of Centre for Artificial Intelligence and Robotics (CAIR), a DRDO defence lab in Bangalore. He is the son of eminent mathematician M V Subbarao.

His Erdős number is two and his Einstein number is three.

Early life and education 
He completed his bachelor's, master's and Ph. D. degrees from University of Wisconsin, Madison.

Career 
He began his career as an assistant professor at the Marquette University in 1969.

Awards and honors
Vidyasagar received several awards and honors, including:
 1983: IEEE Fellow of the Institute of Electrical and Electronics Engineers (IEEE), at the age of 35, one of the youngest to receive this honor, "for contributions to the stability analysis of linear and nonlinear distributed systems"
 1984: the Frederick Emmons Terman Award from the American Society for Engineering Education
 2004: IEEE Spectrum named him as one of forty "Tech Gurus"
 2008: the IEEE Control Systems Award
 2012: Became a Fellow of Royal Society
 2012: Rufus Oldenburger Medal
 2013: John Ragazzini Education Award, American Automatic Control Council - for outstanding contributions to automatic control education through publication of textbooks and research monographs
 2015: Jawaharlal Nehru Science Fellowship, Government of India
 2017: Fellow, International Federation of Automatic Control
 2017: Named as 125 "People of Impact" during the 125th anniversary of the Department of Electrical Engineering, University of Wisconsin

Books

 1975. Feedback Systems: Input-Output Properties. with C. A. Desoer
 1978. Nonlinear Systems Analysis
 1981. Input-Output Analysis of Large-Scale Interconnected Systems: Decomposition, Well-Posedness and Stability
 1985. Control System Synthesis: A Factorization Approach
 1989. Robot dynamics and control. with Mark W. Spong
 1993. Nonlinear Systems Analysis, (Second Edition)
 1997. A Theory of Learning and Generalization: With Applications to Neural Networks and Control Systems
 2003. Learning and Generalization With Applications to Neural Networks, (Second Edition)
 2006. Robot modeling and control. with S. Hutchinson and Mark W. Spong
 2012. Computational Cancer Biology: An Interaction Networks Approach
 2014. Hidden Markov Processes: Theory and Applications to Biology

References

External links
 Home page

Control theorists
Indian roboticists
Fellow Members of the IEEE
University of Texas at Dallas faculty
1947 births
Living people
Telugu people
Engineers from Andhra Pradesh
Systems biologists
American people of Indian descent
American people of Telugu descent
Tata Consultancy Services people
Scientists from Andhra Pradesh
Indian business executives
Fellows of the Royal Society
20th-century Indian engineers
Indian technology writers
20th-century Indian non-fiction writers